Maen Llia is a standing stone which sits on moorland at  in the Brecon Beacons National Park in Powys, Wales.

The stone which is a large piece of intraformational conglomerate from the Old Red Sandstone measures 3.7 m (12 ft) high by 2.8 m (9 ft) wide by 0.6 m (2 ft). It is roughly diamond-shaped and is partly moss-covered. Its age and original purpose are unknown though it is thought to date from the Bronze Age. It is a popular tourist attraction, lying just 30 yards off a minor road running north from the village of Ystradfellte in the Waterfall Country towards the hamlet of Heol Senni and Brecon, the county town of Brecknockshire.

There is a low heather-covered henge 200 metres to the southwest. Another significant standing stone, Maen Madoc, lies just off the old Roman road known as Sarn Helen about 2 miles (3.5 km) to the south. Whilst this latter stone bears legible writing, there is none visible on Maen Llia though some faint lettering was reported still to be visible in the mid twentieth century.

Legend has it that the stone goes down to the river, the Afon Llia to drink on occasion. This tale seems likely to be an allusion to the fact that its shadow is cast across the moorland as far as the river when the sun is low in the evening sky.

The stone is a Scheduled Ancient Monument.

References

External links 
https://web.archive.org/web/20110611094214/http://www.brecon-beacons.com/archaelogy-Sarn-Helen-Maen-Madoc-Maen-Llia.htm
https://web.archive.org/web/20090106001419/http://www.megalithic-research-wales.co.uk/MRW/allstones/maenllia/maenllia.html

Megalithic monuments in Wales
History of Powys
Monuments and memorials in Powys
Archaeological sites in the Brecon Beacons National Park